The Biddy Mulligan's pub bombing occurred on the night of Saturday 20 December 1975 with the explosion of a 3 to 5 lb bomb at Biddy Mulligan's, an Irish pub on the corner of Kilburn High Road and Willesden Lane in northwest London. The device, left in a holdall, caused five injuries and damaged the premises.

The Ulster Defence Association (UDA) under the cover name Ulster Freedom Fighters (UFF) claimed responsibility, saying it was targeted because it was frequented by Irish republican sympathisers, with allegedly funds being raised for the Provisional Irish Republican Army (IRA). The attack ignited fears of a loyalist backlash against IRA attacks within England, and it was the first time the UDA struck outside Ireland. Indeed, a supposed Ulster Young Militants (UYM) caller claimed that they were going to "carry the war against the IRA on the mainland." A year earlier the funeral of Michael Gaughan took place in the area, which has a large Irish community, and likely the catalyst of the bombing.

A man and a woman in London, and four men in Glasgow, were arrested in connection with the attack. Samuel Carson and Alexander Brown of Bangor, County Down, and Noel Moore Boyd of Belfast, were jailed for 15, 14 and 12 years respectively at the Old Bailey in October 1976. Archibald McGregor Brown from Cumbernauld, who provided a safe haven in Scotland, received 10 years.

See also
1975 Dublin Airport bombing
Scott's Oyster Bar bombing
Walton's Restaurant bombing
Glasgow pub bombings
Birmingham pub bombings
1975 Conway's Bar attack
Hillcrest Bar bombing
Balcombe Street siege

References

1975 crimes in the United Kingdom
1975 in London
1970s crimes in London
Explosions in 1975
Ulster Defence Association actions
Terrorist incidents in London
Terrorist incidents in the United Kingdom in 1975
December 1975 events in the United Kingdom
Attacks on bars in the United Kingdom
Building bombings in London